Oenogenes fugalis is a species of snout moth in the genus Oenogenes. It was described by Cajetan Felder, Rudolf Felder and Alois Friedrich Rogenhofer in 1875 and is known from Australia.

References

Moths described in 1875
Endotrichini